The Indecent Publications Act was a New Zealand Act of Parliament enacted in 1963. 

It repealed the Indecent Publications Act 1910, Indecent Publications Amendment Act 1954, Indecent Publications Amendment Act 1958, Indecent Publications Amendment Act 1961, and sections of the Crimes Act 1961 relating to the 1910 Act. The Indecent Publications Tribunal was established by the Act.

There were four amendments to the Act before being repealed by the Films, Videos, and Publications Classification Act 1993.

See also
Censorship in New Zealand

References

External links
Text of the Act

Statutes of New Zealand
Censorship in New Zealand
1963 in New Zealand
1963 in New Zealand law
Obscenity law